"Euro-Vision" was the  entry in the Eurovision Song Contest 1980, performed in French by Telex.

The song was performed nineteenth on the night, following 's Trigo Limpio with "Quédate esta noche". At the close of voting, it had received 14 points, placing 17th in a field of 19. The band were moderately pleased with the outcome of the contest, but for a somewhat unusual reason: at the time lead singer  was quoted as saying: "We had hoped to finish last, but Portugal decided otherwise. We got ten points from them and finished on the 19th spot". In hindsight their participation in the Contest however seems to have served its marketing purposes; some thirty years on "Euro-Vision" remains one of the band's best-known songs, both in Belgium and internationally.

The song was the first entry ever to mention the contest by name as part of what is generally agreed to have been a send-up of the whole event (previous entries such as Schmetterlinge's "Boom Boom Boomerang" had parodied the contest without actually naming it). Further, in contrast to the generally upbeat and lively entries submitted from other entrants, Telex performed from behind synthesisers and in a robotic – somewhat Kraftwerk-esque – manner.

Telex released the song in French and English language versions and the band subsequently re-recorded the track for their first 'greatest hits' compilation More than Distance, also released in 1980, then retitled Neurovision. Furthermore, in 1993 Telex released their first CD box set, once again with a reference to their Eurovision participation back in 1980; the album was entitled Belgium...One Point.

External links
 Official Eurovision Song Contest site, history by year, 1980.
 Detailed info and lyrics, Diggiloo Thrush, "Euro-Vision".
 TELEX-MUSIC.COM
 Telex - Euro-Vision - Discogs

References

Telex (band) songs
1980 singles
Disques Vogue singles
Sire Records singles
Eurovision songs of Belgium
Eurovision songs of 1980
French-language songs
English-language Belgian songs
1980 songs
Metafictional works
Songs about television